Rescue 77 is an American medical drama television series about the professional and personal lives of paramedics in Los Angeles, California. The series created by Gregory Widen and aired from March 15 to May 3, 1999 on The WB. The creator and executive producer was Gregory Widen, a former Southern California firefighter and paramedic, and the writer of the 1991 firefighting drama Backdraft. His goal for the show was to provide a more realistic depiction of the lives of firefighters and paramedics than previous emergency medical television series such as Emergency!

Summary
The show followed the members of a three-person paramedic team assigned to a fictional Los Angeles fire station, Station 77. Kathleen Ryan returns to work in the pilot episode following an emotional breakdown after a stressful call. Throughout the series, there is obvious romantic tension between Ryan and her partner Michael Bell, who is dating a nurse and struggling with his father, who wants Bell to quit his paramedic job and work for the family company. The third member of the team, Wick Lobo, is a young, energetic rookie eager to prove himself. The main characters shared a high sense of duty and loyalty to each other and their commander, Captain Durfee.

Cast

Main
 Victor Browne as Michael Bell
 Christian Kane as Wick Lobo
 Marjorie Monaghan as Kathleen Ryan
 Richard Roundtree as Captain Durfee

Recurring
 Terence Knox as Firefighter Bridges
 Robia Scott as Nurse Maggie Cates
 Jon Cypher as Charles Bell

Episodes

References

External links
 
 

1990s American drama television series
1999 American television series debuts
1999 American television series endings
1990s American medical television series
Emergency medical responders
English-language television shows
Television series about firefighting
Television shows set in Los Angeles
Television series by CBS Studios
Television series by Spelling Television
The WB original programming